Center Township is a township in McDonald County, in the U.S. state of Missouri.

Center Township was named for its central location on the eastern border of the county.

References

Townships in Missouri
Townships in McDonald County, Missouri